The  was a field gun used by the Imperial Japanese Army during World War I, the Second Sino-Japanese War and World War II. It was a licensed copy of a 1905 Krupp design.  The Type 38 designation was given to this gun as it was accepted in the 38th year of Emperor Meiji's reign (1905). By 1941 it was thoroughly obsolete and relegated to second-line service.

History and development
Interest in the Krupp 105mm field gun was expressed by the Imperial Japanese Army General Staff in November 1904, during the height of the Russo-Japanese War. As warship production in Japan had priority during the 1890s, the technology and industrial infrastructure to construct medium or large caliber weapons was reserved for the Imperial Navy, as a consequence, the first twenty units were imported from Germany in 1905. Further units were produced under license in Japan by the army's Osaka Arsenal under the direction of arms designer General Arisaka Nariakira from 1907, and began appearing in front line combat units from 1911.

After experience in the First World War, the Type 38 was upgraded to the "C" version, with a lengthened bore and modified carriage to permit a higher angle of fire. This modified version was already obsolete by the start of the Second Sino-Japanese War, but continued to be used by reserve and second-line forces through the end of World War II.

Design
The Type 38 105mm field gun was a conventional design, with crew seats on the gun shield and a solid box trail. It had a hydro-spring recoil system, interrupted screw type breechblock, and 1/16-inch gun shield.

It was designed to be towed by a team of eight horses, or by an arms tractor.

The Type 38 105 mm field gun was capable of firing high-explosive, armor-piercing warhead, shrapnel, incendiary, smoke and illumination and gas shells.

Japanese Use
Type 38 10 cm field gun was initially at the Battle of Tsingtao in China during World War I. It was later used in rear echelon formations in the puppet state of Manchukuo and in various campaigns in mainland China during the Second Sino-Japanese War in the 1930s. Due to its obsolescence, it was not encountered by Allied forces in the Pacific. Some units were also used for shore defense in coastal artillery batteries in the Boso Peninsula, and Tokyo Bay in the Japanese home islands.

Chinese Use 
Weapons captured by the Chinese remained in use in China by both the National Revolutionary Army of the Kuomintang government and Chinese Red Army of the Chinese Communist Party government at least through the Chinese Civil War.

Russian and Spanish Use 
In 1914, 120 guns were ordered by Russian Empire, converted to use 4.2-inch (107mm) Russian munitions for the 107 mm gun M1910. They received the designation 42-line quick-firing gun Model 1905. These guns continued service in the Soviet Red Army until World War II (there were still 88 such guns in 1936).  The Soviets later sold 74 guns to the Second Spanish Republic during the Spanish Civil War where they were often used for counter battery fire.

Users 

  Imperial Japanese Army
  Imperial Russian Army
  Soviet Red Army
  Spanish Republican Army
  National Revolutionary Army
  People's Liberation Army

References
 Bishop, Chris (eds) The Encyclopedia of Weapons of World War II. Barnes & Nobel. 1998. 
 Chamberlain, Peter and Gander, Terry. Light and Medium Field Artillery. Macdonald and Jane's (1975). 
 Chant, Chris. Artillery of World War II, Zenith Press, 2001, 
 McLean, Donald B. Japanese Artillery; Weapons and Tactics. Wickenburg, Ariz.: Normount Technical Publications 1973. .
 Mayer, S.L. The Rise and Fall of Imperial Japan. The Military Press (1984) 
 War Department Special Series No 25 Japanese Field Artillery October 1944
 US Department of War, TM 30-480, Handbook on Japanese Military Forces, Louisiana State University Press, 1994. 
 Barsukov E. Russian artillery in World War 1914-1918 (in Russian: Барсуков Е.З. Русская артиллерия в мировую войну 1914–1918 гг.). State Military Publishing House of People's Commissariat of Defense of the USSR, 1938.

External links
 Type 38 on Taki's Imperial Japanese Army page

Notes

World War I guns
World War I artillery of Japan
World War II field artillery
3
105 mm artillery